Robert Lendrum Cromie (14 August 1881 – 30 January 1962) was an Australian rules footballer who played with St Kilda in the Victorian Football League (VFL).

Notes

External links 

1881 births
1962 deaths
Australian rules footballers from Western Australia
St Kilda Football Club players
North Fremantle Football Club players
Brighton Football Club players